Robert Snyder is a former United States soldier and former interim Chief of Staff of the United States Department of Veterans Affairs since January 2016. 

From January 20, 2017, to February 13, 2017, he served as the Acting Secretary of Veterans Affairs.

References

American civil servants
Trump administration cabinet members
United States Secretaries of Veterans Affairs
Living people
Year of birth missing (living people)
People from Ravenswood, West Virginia